Pannonia Savia or simply Savia, also known as Pannonia Ripariensis, was a Late Roman province. It was formed in the year 295, during the Tetrarchy reform of Roman emperor Diocletian, and assigned to the civil diocese of Pannonia, which was attached in the fourth century to the Praetorian prefecture of Illyricum, and later to the Praetorian prefecture of Italy.

During the 4th and 5th centuries, the province was raided several times, by migrating peoples, including Huns and Goths. In the 490s, it became part of the Ostrogothic Kingdom.

The capital of the province was Siscia (today Sisak). Pannonia Savia included parts of present-day Croatia, Slovenia and Bosnia and Herzegovina.

See also 

 Pannonia
 Roman provinces
 Roman Empire

References

Sources

External links
 Map of western Illyricum

Savia
Late Roman provinces
Pannonia Superior
Illyricum (Roman province)
Croatia in the Roman era
Slovenia in the Roman era
Bosnia and Herzegovina in the Roman era
295 establishments
290s establishments in the Roman Empire
States and territories established in the 290s
5th-century disestablishments in the Roman Empire
States and territories disestablished in the 5th century